Ronderosia is a genus of spur-throated grasshoppers in the family Acrididae. There are about 10 described species in Ronderosia, found in South America.

Species
These species belong to the genus Ronderosia:
 Ronderosia bergii (Stål, 1878)
 Ronderosia cinctipes (Bruner, 1906)
 Ronderosia dubia (Bruner, 1906)
 Ronderosia forcipata (Rehn, 1918)
 Ronderosia gracilis (Bruner, 1911)
 Ronderosia malloi (Liebermann, 1966)
 Ronderosia ommexechoides Carbonell & Mesa, 2006
 Ronderosia paraguayensis (Bruner, 1906)
 Ronderosia piceomaculata (Carbonell, 1972)
 Ronderosia robusta (Bruner, 1906)

References

External links

 

Acrididae